In mathematical logic, a non-standard model of arithmetic is a model of (first-order) Peano arithmetic that contains non-standard numbers.  The term standard model of arithmetic refers to the standard natural numbers 0, 1, 2, ….  The elements of any model of Peano arithmetic are linearly ordered and possess an initial segment isomorphic to the standard natural numbers. A non-standard model is one that has additional elements outside this initial segment.  The construction of such models is due to Thoralf Skolem (1934).

Existence 

There are several methods that can be used to prove the existence of non-standard models of arithmetic.

From the compactness theorem 

The existence of non-standard models of arithmetic can be demonstrated by an application of the compactness theorem.  To do this, a set of axioms P* is defined in a language including the language of Peano arithmetic together with a new constant symbol x. The axioms consist of the axioms of Peano arithmetic P together with another infinite set of axioms: for each numeral n, the axiom x > n is included. Any finite subset of these axioms is satisfied by a model that is the standard model of arithmetic plus the constant x interpreted as some number larger than any numeral mentioned in the finite subset of P*. Thus by the compactness theorem there is a model satisfying all the axioms P*. Since any model of P* is a model of P (since a model of a set of axioms is obviously also a model of any subset of that set of axioms), we have that our extended model is also a model of the Peano axioms. The element of this model corresponding to x cannot be a standard number, because as indicated it is larger than any standard number.

Using more complex methods, it is possible to build non-standard models that possess more complicated properties. For example, there are models of Peano arithmetic in which Goodstein's theorem fails. It can be proved in Zermelo–Fraenkel set theory that Goodstein's theorem holds in the standard model, so a model where Goodstein's theorem fails must be non-standard.

From the incompleteness theorems 

Gödel's incompleteness theorems also imply the existence of non-standard models of arithmetic.
The incompleteness theorems show that a particular sentence G, the Gödel sentence of Peano arithmetic, is neither provable nor disprovable in Peano arithmetic. By the completeness theorem, this means that G is false in some model of Peano arithmetic. However, G is true in the standard model of arithmetic, and therefore any model in which G is false must be a non-standard model. Thus satisfying ~G is a sufficient condition for a model to be nonstandard. It is not a necessary condition, however; for any Gödel sentence G and any infinite cardinality there is a model of arithmetic with G true and of that cardinality.

Arithmetic unsoundness for models with ~G true

Assuming that arithmetic is consistent, arithmetic with ~G is also consistent. However, since ~G states that arithmetic is inconsistent, the result will not be ω-consistent (because ~G is false and this violates ω-consistency).

From an ultraproduct 

Another method for constructing a non-standard model of arithmetic is via an ultraproduct. A typical construction uses the set of all sequences of natural numbers, .  Identify two sequences if they agree at all but finitely many terms. The resulting semiring is a non-standard model of arithmetic.  It can be identified with the hypernatural numbers.

Structure of countable non-standard models 

The  ultraproduct models are uncountable.  One way to see this is to construct an injection of the infinite product of N into the ultraproduct. However, by the Löwenheim–Skolem theorem there must exist countable non-standard models of arithmetic. One way to define such a model is to use Henkin semantics.

Any countable non-standard model of arithmetic has order type , where ω is the order type of the standard natural numbers, ω* is the dual order (an infinite decreasing sequence) and η is the order type of the rational numbers.  In other words, a countable non-standard model begins with an infinite increasing sequence (the standard elements of the model). This is followed by a collection of "blocks," each of order type , the order type of the integers. These blocks are in turn densely ordered with the order type of the rationals. The result follows fairly easily because it is easy to see that the blocks of non-standard numbers have to be dense and linearly ordered without endpoints, and the order type of the rationals is the only countable dense linear order without endpoints.

So, the order type of the countable non-standard models is known. However, the arithmetical operations are much more complicated.

Also one can define "square roots" such as the least v such that . These cannot be within a standard finite number of any rational multiple of u. Once more,  has to be larger than any standard finite number for any standard finite m, n.     

This shows that the arithmetical structure of a countable non-standard model is more complex than the structure of the rationals. There is more to it than that though: Tennenbaum's theorem shows that for any countable non-standard model of Peano arithmetic there is no way to code the elements of the model as (standard) natural numbers such that either the addition or multiplication operation of the model is computable on the codes. This result was first obtained by Stanley Tennenbaum in 1959.

References

Citations

Sources 

 Boolos, George, and Jeffrey, Richard 1974. Computability and Logic, Cambridge University Press. .

See also
Non-Euclidean geometry — about non-standard models in geometry

Arithmetic
Formal theories of arithmetic
Mathematical logic
Model theory